The Advanced Avionics Module or AAM was a module launched on board PSLV-C8 along with the Italian satellite AGILE on 23 April 2007. It was designed by ISRO to test advanced launch vehicle avionics systems like mission computers, navigation and telemetry systems. At lift-off, it weighed 185 kg.

It was mounted inside the Dual Launch Adapter, on top of which the AGILE was mounted.

The AAM reentered the Earth's atmosphere on 19 July 2022.

References 

Spacecraft launched in 2007
Spacecraft which reentered in 2022
Satellites of India